An equestrian statue of Elizabeth II stands in Windsor Great Park near Windsor, Berkshire. The statue, designed by sculptor Philip Jackson, was commissioned by the Crown Estate in honour of the queen's Golden Jubilee. The monument was dedicated in 2003.

History 
The statue was commissioned by the Crown Estate for the Golden Jubilee of Elizabeth II. Sculptor Philip Jackson was selected to design the equestrian statue. It was dedicated on 27 October 2003 and is notable for being the first public statue of Elizabeth II in the United Kingdom. As part of the dedication, the statue was blessed by The Reverend Canon John Ovenden.

Design 
The statue is approximately 1.5 times life-size and is located at the highest point of Queen Anne's Ride in the park. Elizabeth II is depicted as she would have looked like in the 1970s, while the horse is intentionally not modeled after any specific horse.

See also 
 List of equestrian statues in the United Kingdom

References

External links 

Golden Jubilee of Elizabeth II
2003 establishments in England
2003 sculptures
Buildings and structures completed in 2003
Statues of Elizabeth II
Equestrian statues in the United Kingdom
Monuments and memorials in Berkshire
Royal monuments in the United Kingdom
Sculptures of women in the United Kingdom
Buildings and structures in Windsor Great Park